Kojic may refer to:

 Kojić, Serbian surname
 Kojic acid